Break Every Rule World Tour is the sixth concert tour by singer Tina Turner. The tour supported her sixth solo album Break Every Rule (1986). It was sponsored by Pepsi-Cola and broke box office records in 13 different countries: England, Germany, the Netherlands, Switzerland, Belgium, Norway, Sweden, Spain, Italy, Austria, France, Ireland, and Denmark. It was the third highest-grossing tour by a female artist in North America in 1987, and the highest-grossing female tour of the 1980s with a total of $60 million. Her show in Rio de Janeiro remains the largest paying concert audience by a female artist with 180,000 spectators.

Background 
The tour was originally billed as Turner's "last tour". In an interview with Jet magazine, Turner stated,
It is my last tour for now. There probably won't be a tour with the next album because I want to devote some time to my movie career. But, I don't plan to retire.

The European tour kicked off on March 4, 1987, in front of a sold-out crowd of over 15,000 people at the Olympiahalle in Munich, Germany, a venue that she would later play 7 more times during the tour. During the first few shows, the tour went without Turner's signature hit "Proud Mary". Turner avoided the song because she had done it for so many years. It wasn't until her performance at the Rotterdam Ahoy that she tried the song in the set list. Turner stated, "The crowd erupted and sang the song for us. That's when I realized, 'We've got to put 'Mary' back in, she's still rolling on the river.'"

The most memorable and unusual moment for Turner was in Locarno, Switzerland. The stage for the concert had been built in the center of the town. As Turner recalls, "The stage was literally in the middle of the street surrounded by apartment buildings with parents and little kids sitting on their balconies in their night robes." Before her concerts at Johanneshov Isstadion in Sweden, Turner got a bad sinus infection and had to cancel her concerts. The arena was sold out and when the concert promoter went on stage to tell the audience, instead of booing the 13,000 people cheered with understanding. When Turner returned, she played to an even bigger audience. In her stadium concert in Ireland, Turner attracted a huge crowd of over 60,000 people. During this massive concert, Turner nearly stopped the show because of fans in the front getting crushed by other fans. The European tour ended on July 26, 1987, where it began in Munich, Germany. Turner recalls", Our biggest crowd came towards the end of the tour in Munich. We had already played eight indoor shows there to about 120,000 people and once I have been to a city, I'm always reluctant to go back soon afterward. [Then] we attracted another 100,000 people outdoors, I was really quite astounded. It felt like the Rolling Stones when they drew those huge crowds."

The tour proved to be most successful in Germany, where Turner played over 40 shows to 800,000 fans. Turner recalls that Germany has always been "special" to her. The European tour itself played to over 1.7 million people, more than any tour before it. The tour continued to break records in South America. Turner's performance at the Maracanã Stadium in Rio de Janeiro attracted over 180,000 spectators, one of the largest concert attendances in the 20th century, earning her a Guinness World Record.

Opening act 
Level 42 
Wang Chung 
Glass Tiger 
Dragon 
Marshall Crenshaw 
Go West

Setlist 
Act I
"What You Get Is What You See"
"Break Every Rule"
"I Can't Stand the Rain"
"Typical Male"
"Acid Queen"
Act II
"Girls"
"Two People"
"Back Where You Started"
"Better Be Good to Me"
Act III
"Addicted to Love"
"Private Dancer"
"We Don't Need Another Hero (Thunderdome)"
"What's Love Got to Do with It"
Act IV
"Help"
"Let's Stay Together"
Act V
"Proud Mary"
"Show Some Respect"
"It's Only Love" 
Encore
"Nutbush City Limits"
"Paradise Is Here"

Tour dates

Box office score data

Personnel 
James Ralston – guitar, vocals
Laurie Wisefield – guitar
Bob Feit – bass guitar, vocals
Jack Bruno – drums
Steve Scales – percussion
John Miles – keyboards, guitar, vocals
Don Snow – keyboards, saxophone, vocals
Ollie Marland – keyboards, vocals
Deric Dyer – saxophone, keyboards

Broadcast and recordings 

Her world record-breaking Break Every Rule Tour show of 1988 held in a single night at the Rio de Janeiro's Maracanã Stadium, was later released in video form on VHS and DVD called "Tina Live in Rio 88'".
With this particular show alone, she entered the Guinness Book of World Records because she set the record of drawing 180,000 paying fans to a one-night show alone.

The VHS was released with the following thirteen songs:
 "Addicted to Love"
 "I Can't Stand the Rain"
 "Typical Male"
 "Better Be Good to Me"
 "Private Dancer"
 "We Don't Need Another Hero (Thunderdome)"
 "What's Love Got to Do with It"
 "Help"
 "Let's Stay Together"
 "Proud Mary"
 "What You Get Is What You See"
 "Break Every Rule"
 "Paradise Is Here"

Additionally, a TV special recorded at the Camden Palace in London, was released as "Break Every Rule starring Tina Turner". The songs included on that video album:

 "Afterglow" (Music Video)
 Intro: Max Headroom
 Back Where You Started
 Break Every Rule
 What You Get Is What You See
 Overnight Sensation
 A Change Is Gonna Come
 Two People
 Addicted To Love
 In The Midnight Hour
 634-5789
 Land Of 1,000 Dances
 Paradise Is Here (Music Video)
 Girls (Music Video)

See also 
List of highest-attended concerts
List of highest-grossing concert tours

External links 
 Tina Turner | Break Every Rule Tour 1987–88
 International Tina Turner Fan Club – Tour – Break Every Rule 1987–1988

References 

Tina Turner concert tours
1987 concert tours
1988 concert tours